iTunes Originals – R.E.M. is an album of interviews and original and previously recorded music by R.E.M. released on December 28, 2004, to promote the album Around the Sun and the Around the World tour. It was only made available through iTunes. It was the second such iTunes-only release by the band, following Vancouver Rehearsal Tapes and before Live from London.

This release is notable for a (live in) studio version of "Permanent Vacation", a song that dates from R.E.M.'s earliest days (pre-Murmur), but a recording of which was never released before (a low quality rehearsal version and live versions from 1980 and 1981 did appear on bootlegs however). The band rediscovered the song in the early 2000s and resumed playing it live, choosing to finally release it as part of iTunes Originals. It has no relation to the song or album by Aerosmith, which was recorded 7 years after R.E.M. wrote their song.

Reception
Writing for AllMusic, Stephen Thomas Erlewine called the collection "a compelling listen for serious fans".

Track listing
All songs written by Bill Berry, Peter Buck, Mike Mills, and Michael Stipe except where noted.  Spoken word/non-song tracks in italics.
→ iTunes Originals – 0:06
"Everybody Hurts" – 5:20
→ The Beginning – 1:41
"Permanent Vacation" (*)  – 2:27
→ The Cause and Effect of Pageant – 2:34
"These Days" (*)  – 3:24
→ The Biggest College Band in the World – 1:18
"Exhuming McCarthy" (*)  – 3:11
→ Bubblegum Pop – 0:58
"Stand" – 3:13
→ Reaching Clarity in Lyric Writing – 1:27
"World Leader Pretend" – 4:19
→ The Biggest Surprise Hit – 1:01
"Losing My Religion" – 4:29
→ Monster – 0:55
"Bang and Blame" – 5:31
→ The Dark Horse Favorite Album – 0:56
"E-Bow the Letter" – 5:24
→ The Impact of Bill Berry Leaving the Band – 2:15
"At My Most Beautiful" – 3:35
→ A Song That Should Have Been a Hit – 0:43
"I've Been High" (*)  – 3:24
→ Coming Full Circle – 2:34
"Final Straw" – 4:06
→ The Two Most Political Songs on the Album – 1:39
"I Wanted to Be Wrong" (*)  – 4:46
→ Inside "The Outsiders" – 1:00
"The Outsiders" (*)  – 4:14
→ A Profound Love of Music – 1:10
"The Boy in the Well" (*)  – 5:07

Tracks with an asterisk (*) are live re-recordings exclusive to this compilation.

See also
iTunes Originals

References

R.E.M.
R.E.M. compilation albums
2004 live albums
2004 compilation albums
R.E.M. live albums
Albums produced by Pat McCarthy (record producer)
Albums produced by Scott Litt